Workplace safety standards are sets of standards, aimed at safety at workplaces and to reduce occupational risk from occupational illnesses.

History 

The Russian scientist Mikhail Lomonosov in 1763 first describes the dangers of mining in his book The First Foundations of Metallurgy, or Ore Affairs.
The history of human safety in the workplace began in 1802 with the Health and Morals of Apprentices Act. In 1893 in the United States, Railroad Safety Appliance Act was formed. In 1911 were introduced Coal Mines Act.
In 1947, the General Agreement on Tariffs and Trade (GATT) was signed and published by a collaborative group of 23 countries working to establish smooth international trade. In the United States the first Federal Safety Standards for cars become effective 1 January 1968. These new standards help protect drivers against unreasonable risk of crashes occurring as a result of the design, construction or performance of motor vehicles. In 2015 was created EFM scientist against EMF radiation. On 11 May 2015, Dr. Martin Blank in a three-minute video makes an appeal to pay attention for dangerous magnetic fields from our communication devices.

Human safety organizations 
  International Non-Ionizing Radiation Committee (INIRC)
  International Radiation Protection Association (IRPA)
 Occupational Safety and Health Act (OSHA). The Occupational Safety and Health Act of 1970 mandates that all nongovernment employers provide a safe and healthful workplace for their employees.
National Institute for Occupational Safety and Health (NIOSH)
 National Council on Radiation Protection and Measurements (NCRP)
  (Organization of Health and Safety Activities)
  (OSHE Georgia)
 
 European Agency for Safety and Health at Work
 China Occupational Safety and Health Association (COSHA)
  Ministry of Labor and Health OSH India

Standards 

  БДС(Български Държавен Стандарт) (Bulgarian state standard) – ISO 45001:2018 (БДС ISO 45001:2018) Bulgaria
  GB/CCC – China CHN-1974-L-37879 Protection against particular hazards
  NF NF EN 358 France
 BS (British standard) BS EN 1005-3:2002+A1:2008 – United Kingdom 
 IS (India Standardization) – India – IS-5216, IS-5571, IS-6665
 PN (Polska Norma) – Poland – PN-93/N-01256/03 Znaki BHP w miejscu pracy
  
  OSHA – United States; IAEA safety standards – nuclear, radiation waste safety standards
  REAL DECRETO 486/1997

Classification

Standard protection from radio frequency electromagnetic fields 
Continuous exposure to high frequency or high intensity electromagnetic fields can lead to instantaneous health problems or over time to develop a variety of illnesses, such as nervous disorders and others. Low frequency fields with frequencies between 0 and 10 megahertz that are strong enough can stimulate sensory organs or nerves and cause magnetophosphenes (light flashes), vertigo, nausea or muscle twitches and pain. The standards are drawn up with a set of rules for protection from to limit human exposure to electric fields, magnetic fields and electromagnetic fields. Frequency bands of danger EMF, Zones of danger EMF, types of risks, safety and shielding equipment are categorized in the standards.

  (0 Hz - 300 GHz)
 GB 8702-88 
 1999/519/CE Council Recommendation of 12 July 1999 on the limitation of exposure of the general public to electromagnetic fields (0 Hz to 300 GHz)
 NF EN 50360  (300 MHz - 3 GHz)
 
 DGUV V15 
 CEI EN 62209-1
 PN-EN ISO/IEC 17025:2005 
 
  ANSI/IEEE C95.1–1992 IEEE Standard for Safety Levels with Respect to Human Exposure to Radio Frequency Electromagnetic Fields,
3 kHz to 300 GHz

EMF medical devices 
A high frequency electromagnetic field can cause negative effects on the nervous system. Also, high intensity fields can cause serious damage to some organs. The health of people with implanted pacemakers and other electronic devices can be seriously harmed. Such irradiation can lead to death.
 
 DGUV V15
 BS EN 45502-1: 1998 Active implantable medical devices Part 1. General requirements for safety, marking and information to be provided by the manufacturer
 CEI EN 62209-1
 
 PN-EN ISO/IEC 17025:2005
 C95.1-2345-2014 IEEE Standard for Military Workplaces—Force Health Protection Regarding Personnel Exposure to Electric, Magnetic, and Electromagnetic Fields, 0 Hz to 300 GHz

Laser protection standard 
Laser damage can be fatal to human vision. In the standards are defined the types of the laser equipment and its application. Safe distances from the laser equipment to the visual apparatus are also categorized.

 
 GB 10320-1995 
 
 CEI 1381G
 IS 14624 (Part 2) : 2012
 PN-91/T-06700
 
 EN 60825 (IEC 825)

Protection from dangerous substances and preparations  
These standards are set of rules and describe dangerous substances in machine oils, polycyclic aromatic hydrocarbons in extender oils and other chemical materials used in workplace. The Russian standard describes the physical and chemical properties of dangerous oils.

 
 DIRECTIVE 2005/69/EC
 IS 1446: Classification of Dangerous Goods
 PN-EN 589
 
 CC 813.11 Ordinance on Protection against Dangerous Substances and Preparations

Welding safety 

The standards are made up of the following chapters:General Provision - sanitary rules for welding, surfacing and metal cutting, concentrations of harmful substances in the air of the work area;Requirements for technological process:organization of technological processes of welding and surrounding electrical installations, welding of medium and small size products in stationary conditions;Industrial space requirements.

 
 AQ 4214-2011 
 NTP 494: 
 NF An 85-002
 DIN EN 1011-1
 
 Is 818 Code of Practice for Safety and Health for Welding
 PN-EN 1598:2004 
 
 AWS D17.1/D17.1M:2017

Vibration safety 
 
 
 NTP 839 
 NF EN ISO 13090 
 IS 13276-1: Mechanical Vibration
 2002/44/WE 
 
 AS2670 - 2001 Evaluation of human exposure to whole-body vibration.
 AS ISO 5349.1-2013 Mechanical vibration - Measurement and evaluation of human exposure to hand-transmitted vibration - General requirements

Noise safety 
 IS 3483-1965
 IEEE 656-2018 - IEEE Standard for the Measurement of Audible Noise from Overhead Transmission Lines
 
 PN-EN 352-5:2005/A1:2007
 NF EN 61310-1 
 DIN 4109

Ultrasound safety 
Working with ultrasound can damage the nervous and auditory systems.
 
 IEEE 790-1989 - IEEE Guide for Medical Ultrasound Field Parameter Measurements
 NF C74-335 
 DIN EN 60601-2-5

Air 

This European Standard provides guidance on the selection of procedures and installations for the use and maintenance of devices for determining concentrations of chemical and biological agents in the workplace air.

 
 BS EN ISO 16017-1:2001, Indoor, ambient and workplace air
 NF EN ISO 16017-2

Microclimatic parameters of the work environment

Thermal environment 
 
 ISO 7726 Ergonomics of the thermal environment – Instruments for measuring physical
quantities
 ISO 8896 Ergonomics of the thermal environment – Determination of metabolic rate
 DIN EN ISO 7730

Nanotechnology safety 

 
  ISO/TS 12901-1:2012(en) Nanotechnologies - Occupational risk management applied to engineered nanomaterials - Part 1: Principles and approaches

Artificial light on workplace 
The use of artificial light as the sole source of light or mixing artificial and daylight might cause ill-health effects, both physical and mental, such as eye strain, headaches, or fatigue. The standards address the types of light that negatively affect vision, angles of light in different environments, illumination standards per square meter, and protection methods such as the UGR method.

 
 GB50034-2013 
 
 EN 12464 “Lighting of indoor workplaces”

Hazardous Area Classification 
 BS EN 60079 Hazardous Area Classification and Control of Ignition Sources
 IS 5572-1994 Hazardous Area Classification IS 5572-1994
 
 National Electrical Code(NEC) Article 505
 IEC 60079-10.2 Classification of areas

Protection devices 
EMF meter – an instrument for measuring danger EMF fields, which affects human health (EMF measurement)
Environmental meter – an instrument for measuring hazardous materials response
EMF shield protection materials

Supporting software 

There are thousands of software products today which can simulate workplace hazards.
Narda EFC-400EP – software for calculation dangerous magnetic fields
Sphera – software for Integrated Risk Management software and information services with a focus on Environmental Health & Safety (EHS)
MY Compliance Management
ALOHA Software – details can be entered about a real or potential chemical release and it will generate threat zone estimates for various types of hazards
WeldZone Simulator – simulates the effect of electromagnetic fields on welders, providing a 3D visual representation of exposure levels and highlighting the associated risks

Congress and Conferences for health and safety work

World Congress on Safety and Health 
The forum is organized by the International Labour Organization. The first World Congress on Safety and Health was held in Rome in 1955.
2020 Canada XXII
2017 Singapore XXI
2014 Germany XX

Workplace Safety Conference 
The forum is organized by OSHA.
American Conference of Governmental Industrial Hygienists

Workplace safety symbols 
Workplace safety symbols are classified in several categories:
European hazard pictograms
ADR European hazard signs
GHS hazard pictograms
Green Emergency – emergency exits, escape routes, and on first aid kits ISO 7010
Blue Mandatory – instructions to wash hands, use a safety harness, or wear safety glasses for example
Red Prohibition – instruction to not touch, not enter, no access, and even evacuation

Gallery

See also 
Occupational safety and health

References 

Alexey Alexiev Influence of electromagnetic field on the human body
Маринела Йорданова Управление на трудовите условия и производствения риск
Georgi Tsurov Analysis of Workplace safety standards TU-GO,2016
Найден Йорданов,Божидар Кибаров,Анатоли Малев Правилник по безопасността на труда при експлоатацията на електрическите уредби и съоръжения,Държавно издателство "Техника"1986
Edvard Csanyi Dangerous magnetic field exposure near transformer substation in the building
Marinko Stojkov,Damir Šljivac,Damir ŠljivacLajos Jozsa Electric and Magnetic Field Computation of 35 kV Voltage Level of Transformer Substation 35/10 kV Using CDEGS Software
Binay Kumar Oil and Lubricant Hazard Effects on Human Health

Occupational safety and health
Safety codes
Lists of standards